{{DISPLAYTITLE:C10H14O}}
The molecular formula C10H14O (molar mass: 150.22 g/mol, exact mass: 150.104465 u) can refer to:

 o-sec-Butylphenol
 Carvacrol
 Carvone
 Chrysanthenone
 2-Ethyl-4,5-dimethylphenol, a phenolic compound found in rosemary essential oil
 Levoverbenone
 Menthofuran
 Penguinone
 Perillaldehyde
 Perillene
 Rosefuran
 Safranal
 Thymol
 Umbellulone
 Verbenone